Oak Park Unified School District (OPUSD) is a K-12 school district in southeast Ventura County, California, USA. It consists of seven public schools in the community of Oak Park.

History
When the community of Oak Park was created in the 1900s, it was within the Simi Valley Unified School District. However, there was no high school in the area, so students had to be bused 23 miles (37 km) each way to Simi Valley for school.

In the early 1970s, residents appealed to the Las Virgenes Unified School District to annex their neighborhood. School district officials were so inclined, but residents of neighboring Agoura Hills considered people in Oak Park to be lower class. In a 1974 school board meeting where the idea was discussed, one woman complained about Oak Park's "little dope addicts," after which a fight broke out between her husband and an Oak Park resident, and the idea was scrapped.

In 1977, voters approved a measure to create their own school district, followed by a $40-million bond measure to finance new classrooms. Oak Park High School opened in 1981.

Since 2004, the district has also accepted out-of-district students through the State's District of Choice (DOC) program.  These permits do not require a release from resident districts. Both traditional inter-district and District of Choice permits are approved based on the available space within our district. Since becoming a district of choice, Oak Park has become a more diverse district. Prior to becoming a DOC District, the student demographics were 90% white. In the 2019-20 school year the student demographics were 56% White, 25% Asian, 10% Latino, 1.5% Black, and 6% two or more races. In 2021-22, about half of all Oak Park students are attending school under with the interdistrict permit or the DOC program. Since 2000 there have been no new homes built in Oak Park and the resident population has remained approximately the same.

School
The district's seven schools are:

High schools
 Oak Park High School
 Oak View High School
Oak Park Independent School

Middle schools
 Medea Creek Middle School

Elementary schools
 Brookside Elementary School
 Oak Hills Elementary School
 Red Oak Elementary School

References

External links
 

School districts in Ventura County, California
Oak Park, California
School districts established in 1977
1977 establishments in California